Cadwallader Colden Washburn (April 22, 1818May 14, 1882) was an American businessman, politician, and soldier who founded a mill that later became General Mills. A member of the Washburn family of Maine, he was a U.S. Congressman and governor of Wisconsin, and served as a general in the Union Army during the American Civil War.

Education and early career
Washburn was born in Livermore (in modern-day Maine, then a part of Massachusetts), the son of Martha (née Benjamin) and Israel Washburn, Sr. He was one of seven brothers, who included Israel Washburn, Jr., Elihu B. Washburne, William D. Washburn, and Charles Ames Washburn. Washburn attended school in Wiscasset, Maine, and later taught there in 1838–1839. In 1839 he moved to Davenport, Iowa Territory, where he taught school, worked in a store, and worked as a surveyor.  Inspired by his brother Elihu who set up a legal practice in nearby Galena, Illinois, he studied law. In 1842 he was admitted to the Wisconsin bar and moved to Mineral Point, Iowa County, Wisconsin Territory, where he began a legal practice.

Business

Land speculation and banking
In 1844, Washburn formed a partnership with land agent Cyrus Woodman.  Together the two men developed a number of companies, such as the Wisconsin Mining Company. The most successful business venture undertaken by the men was land acquisition. In May 1855 they established Washburn's and Woodman's Mineral Point Bank. Washburn and Woodman dissolved their partnership amicably in 1855.

Minneapolis Mill Company
In 1856, the Minneapolis Mill Company was chartered by the Minnesota territorial legislature.  Among the incorporators were Washburn's cousin Dorilus Morrison, and Robert Smith, an Illinois congressman who had acquired the rights to the water power at the west side of St. Anthony Falls in Minneapolis.  The company struggled initially, and several of the early investors sold out.  Washburn bought in and eventually became president.  His brother William moved to Minneapolis about that time, and actively managed the company.  The company built a dam, a canal and a complex set of water transfer tunnels which were then leased, along with land that the company owned at the foot of the falls, to a variety of mills – cotton mills, woolen mills, sawmills and grist/flour mills.  Eventually the work and investment of the two brothers paid off well, and they used their new-found capital to invest in mills themselves.

Lumber
In 1853, Washburn built a mill at Waubeck on the Chippewa River. In 1859 Washburn moved to La Crosse, Wisconsin, and after his war time service, he engaged in a project to clear the Black River to make it easier to drive logs.  In 1871 he formed the La Crosse Lumber Company, which eventually sawed 20,000,000 board feet of lumber annually.  He also had the largest shingle mill in the upper Mississippi valley.

Flour
In 1866, he built his own Washburn "B" Mill, which was thought at the time to be too large to ever turn a profit. However, he succeeded and in 1874 built an even larger Washburn "A" Mill. The original "A" mill complex was destroyed, along with several nearby buildings, in a flour explosion in 1878, but was later rebuilt. In 1877, Washburn teamed with John Crosby to form the Washburn-Crosby Company. At the same time, Washburn sent William Hood Dunwoody to England to open that market for spring wheat. Successful, Dunwoody became a silent partner and went on to become one of the wealthiest millers in the world. Dunwoody became a philanthropist endowing hospitals, educational facilities which became Dunwoody College of Technology, and a charitable home which ultimately became Dunwoody Village. The corporation eventually became known as General Mills.

Politics and military career

In 1854, Washburn ran for Congress as a Republican, later serving three terms as part of the 34th, 35th and 36th United States Congresses representing Wisconsin's 2nd congressional district, from March 4, 1855, to March 3, 1861. During the 34th Congress, he and his brothers voted for Nathaniel Banks during the protracted 1855-56 House of Representatives Speaker election. In his last term Washburn served as chairman of the Committee on Private Land Claims. He declined to run again in 1860.

The Washburn family had always been strongly opposed to slavery. Washburn moved to La Crosse, Wisconsin in 1861 but returned to Washington, D.C., later that year as a delegate in the peace convention that was held in an attempt to prevent the American Civil War. He served in the Union Army during the Civil War, becoming colonel of the 2nd Wisconsin Volunteer Cavalry, on February 6, 1862; brigadier general of Volunteers on July 16, 1862; and major general on November 29, 1862. Washburn had the honor of having his appointment document signed by President Abraham Lincoln. At one point Ulysses S. Grant called Washburn "one of the best administrative officers we have." He commanded the cavalry of the XIII Corps in the opening stages of Ulysses S. Grant's Vicksburg Campaign. Once siege operations had begun against the city of Vicksburg and Grant called for all available forces, Washburn led a detachment of the XVI Corps during the siege of Vicksburg. He commanded the 1st Division in the XIII Corps in Nathanial P. Banks' operations along the Texas Coast leading the expedition against Fort Esperanza in November 1863.

For the rest of the war he served in administrative capacities in Mississippi and Tennessee. While commanding Union forces in Memphis, he was the target of an unsuccessful raid led by Nathan B. Forrest to kidnap him and other Union generals. He left the Union Army on May 25, 1865.

After the conclusion of the war, Washburn returned to his home in La Crosse, where he was elected again for two terms in the House of Representatives. This time he represented Wisconsin's 6th congressional district at the 40th and 41st Congresses from March 4, 1867, to March 3, 1871, where he was chairman of the Committee on Expenditures on Public Buildings in the first term. He declined to run in 1870.

In 1871, he was urged to run for Governor of Wisconsin against James R. Doolittle. Washburn won the election and was inaugurated governor of Wisconsin on the first Monday in January 1872 and served from 1872 to 1874. He ran unsuccessfully for reelection in 1873.

A year later, he purchased the Edgewood Villa estate from Samuel Marshall, where Edgewood College sits today.

Family life
Shortly after his birth in 1818, Washburn was diagnosed with epilepsy.

On January 1, 1849, New Years Day, he married Jeanette Garr, daughter of Andrew Sheffield Garr and Elizabeth Sinclair Garr. Both were 30-years-old at the time. The following year, the couple brought their first daughter, Jeanette (Nettie) Garr Washburn, into the world in 1850. After giving birth to Nettie her mother, Jeanette, started showing signs of mental illness. After Frances (Fanny) was born two years later, in 1852, Washburn made arrangements for his wife's care at the Bloomingdale Asylum. Later she was transferred to an institution in Brookline, Massachusetts, where she remained until her death at the age of 90 in 1909.

Later life
Washburn donated the Edgewood Villa estate to the Sinsinawa Dominican Sisters of Madison, Wisconsin, in 1881. The Edgewood Villa later became Edgewood College and Edgewood High School. Nearly a year later, on May 14, 1882, he died in Eureka Springs, Arkansas, while on a visit to the springs for his health. His body was interred in Oak Grove Cemetery in La Crosse, Wisconsin.

After his death, his estate was valued at an estimated two to three million dollars. In his will, Cadwallader left money to his daughter and other members of his family. A large bequest was made to the city of La Crosse; land was bought and a building for the La Crosse Public Library erected. However, the largest portion was set aside to pay for the care of his wife, Jeanette.

Legacy

The city of Washburn in Bayfield County, Wisconsin was named after Cadwallader Washburn, as were Washburn County in northern Wisconsin and the city of Washburn, North Dakota, As well as, Washburn Center for Children, and Washburn High School in Minneapolis. Washburn Observatory, at the University of Wisconsin–Madison, was also named for Washburn, who as governor, allocated the money for its construction. La Crosse, Wisconsin, where Washburn is laid to rest at his memorial in the Oak Grove Cemetery, has a downtown neighborhood and park named for the former governor and long time resident of the city.

See also

List of American Civil War generals (Union)
List of U.S. political families

Notes

Attributions

Other references
 Retrieved on 2008-10-30
Our milling roots and beyond , General Mills
Cadwallader C. Washburn, Wisconsin State Historical Society

External links
Washburn/Norland Living History Center, Livermore, Maine
Washburn Center for Children

1818 births
1882 deaths
County officials in Illinois
General Mills people
Republican Party governors of Wisconsin
People from Livermore, Maine
Politicians from La Crosse, Wisconsin
Politicians from Minneapolis
Politicians from Rock Island, Illinois
People of Wisconsin in the American Civil War
Union Army generals
American food company founders
Washburn family
People from Mineral Point, Wisconsin
Republican Party members of the United States House of Representatives from Wisconsin
19th-century American politicians
Burials in Wisconsin
Businesspeople from Minneapolis
19th-century American businesspeople
Military personnel from Illinois